Barrule was a Celtic and folk trio from the Isle of Man. The band's three members were: Tomas Callister (fiddle), Jamie Smith (accordion) and Adam Rhodes (bouzouki). Barrule's discography included both original and traditional Manx language songs.

In 2014, the trio won "Best Debut" in the Spiral Earth awards and have since performed major festivals including Celtic Connections, WOMAD Charlton Park, Sidmouth, Festival Interceltique de Lorient (where they won the prestigious Trophée Loic Raison), Lowender Peran Festival, Cornwall, and the National Celtic Festival in Melbourne. In the autumn of 2013, Barrule was featured in Celtic Family Magazine's debut issue.

Barrule's name paid tribute to the Manx summit and Celtic God Manannán mac Lir who made his home there.

The band's website states that they are no longer active as a band.

Discography

References

Manx musical groups
Celtic music groups